Ortenburg is a municipality and old market town in the district of Passau in Bavaria in Germany.

Geography

Geographical location 
Ortenburg is situated in the forested area south of the Danube and north of the Rott. It is one of the main centres of population in the Lower Bavarian Upland. The majority of the municipality is located in the Wolfach Valley and the Wolfach itself runs directly through Ortenburg.

The market town lies 20 km west of Passau, 10 km south of Vilshofen an der Donau, 12 km northwest of Bad Griesbach and 20 km north of Pocking.

Neighbouring municipalities 
The closest municipalities are Haarbach, Beutelsbach, Vilshofen an der Donau, Fürstenzell, and Bad Griesbach im Rottal. The cities of Passau and Pocking are somewhat farther away.

Administrative division 
The municipality of Ortenburg includes 112 districts.

History

Set in the Wolfach River valley, Ortenburg can look back over a 900-year history.   In about 1120 it was established by the Counts of Ortenburg.   At the same time the upwardly mobile von Kamm family appeared on the scene.   However, during the thirteenth century the von Kamms relocated to Hals (now a quarter of Passau).   The Ortenburg counts, whose own origins lay with the Spanheimer dynasty, were keen to establish their own separate dynastic centre and such the Imperial County of Ortenburg kept its Imperial immediacy until 1806.

The Ortenburgs were among the most powerful of the Bavarian nobility, competing in terms of power and position with the Wittelsbach dynasty.   During the height of their power, during the twelfth and thirteenth centuries, the Ortenburgs held lands from as far south as the Brixen valley, that extended also far into the Upper Palatinate.

Smuggling 
Smuggling across the border
Bibles (Martin Luther) to Habsburg: Hans Ungnad von Weißenwolff, Freiherr von Sonneck, Hans III (1493–1564), famous Bible printer and smuggler in Bad Urach  Smuggler, translator and Slovene refugee Protestant preacher Primož Trubar, who published the first books in Slovene and is regarded as the key consolidator of the Slovene identity, lived in Tübingen Derendingen. In The Free Imperial City (German: Freie Reichsstadt)  bibles and the Ortenburger Ratschlag was produced.

Krypto Protestants
The original chalice in the protestant worship  is still in use in Ortenburg. In this time the church  of Ortemburg was the only  reachable protestant church outside the   border  Crypto-Protestantism of Habsburg Empire.

Mostbauern
The Mostbauern of Ortenburg (orchard meadow farmers) came as grower and cellar master  protestant refugees from Austria.

Notable residents

 Heinrich Deubel (1890–1962), Nazi SS Dachau concentration camp commandant

References

Passau (district)